Joshua "Rookie" Jones was a professional baseball center fielder in the Negro leagues. He played with the Memphis Red Sox in 1932.

References

External links
 and Seamheads

Memphis Red Sox players
Year of birth missing
Year of death missing
Baseball outfielders